UKAMS Ltd. is the UK partner of the EUROPAAMS consortium, the developer of the Principal Anti Air Missile System (PAAMS), a naval air defence weapon system.

UKAMS was originally a consortium of Siemens Plessey Systems, GEC-Marconi and BAeSEMA. However, in 1997 British Aerospace acquired Siemens Plessey's UK operations and in 1998 UKAMS became a wholly owned subsidiary of Matra BAe Dynamics. In 2002 Matra BAe Dynamics was merged into MBDA and continues to be a subsidiary of that group.

References

Aerospace companies of the United Kingdom
Plessey